The Albany County Sheriff's Office is a local police agency in Albany County, Wyoming, United States. It consists of 46 sworn law enforcement officers and 8 civilian support personnel.  the sheriff is Aaron Appelhans, the first African-American to serve as sheriff in Wyoming.

In 2021, the New York Times described the department as "troubled" and plagued by "allegations of nepotism, selective enforcement and excessive force". In 2018, an unarmed man, Robbie Ramirez, was shot and killed by deputy Derek Colling. This was the third time in Colling's career he had shot and killed someone. Colling eventually resigned in 2021.

Sheriff Dave O’Malley resigned in 2020 amid a lawsuit over the shooting, and Appelhans was appointed his replacement. State Representative Cyrus Western replied to a post on Twitter about Appelhans's appointment with an animated GIF from the film Blazing Saddles; after receiving criticism for the tweet, Western deleted the tweet, issued a public apology, and called Appelhans to apologize. Appelhans spoke of his goal of diversifying the department, of which he was the only Black officer at the time. In 2021, Appelhans fired a deputy who was accused of harassing a Black subordinate until the subordinate quit.

Rank structure

See also
 List of law enforcement agencies in Wyoming
 Matthew Shepard, to whose beating the Albany County Sheriff's Office responded

References

External links
 Albany County Sheriff's Office at Facebook

Sheriffs' departments of Wyoming